Season:1946-1947
1st Division
Final league position: 3

Statistics

External links
 WolvesStats for 46/47 season

Wolverhampton Wanderers F.C. seasons
Wolverhampton Wanderers